The Museum of Guadalajara (also Museo Provincial de Guadalajara) is a State-owned museum in Guadalajara, Spain. Opened in 1838, it is the oldest provincial museum in the country. It features sections of Fine Arts, Archaeology and Ethnography. It is hosted at the Palacio del Infantado since 1973.

History 
Created by means of a May 1837 Royal Order, the provincial museum was opened on 19 November 1838. It was originally hosted at the Convent of La Piedad. It moved to different premises, including the Palace of El Infantado, the former convent of La Concepción, back to La Piedad and the Palace of the Provincial Deputation. Following decades of discontinued existence, it was opened again at the Palacio del Infantado on 11 July 1973.

Its management (not the ownership, retained by the Spanish State) was transferred to the Regional Government of Castile-La Mancha by means of a 1984 agreement.

Collection 
The museum displays items from the province of Guadalajara distributed in sections of Fine Arts, Archaeology and Ethnography.

References 
Citations

Bibliography
 
 

Archaeological museums in Spain
Art museums and galleries in Spain
Ethnographic museums in Spain
Guadalajara, Spain
Museums in Castilla–La Mancha
1838 establishments in Spain